Bill Clery was an Irish soccer player who played in the League of Ireland during the 1920s and 1930s.

Clery was a centre forward who played for Bohemians. He once scored 6 goals in an FAI Cup tie against Bray Unknowns in 1930. His best goalscoring season came in 1930/31 when he netted 20 times in all competitions.

Bill is second in Bohemians all time FAI Cup goalscorers list with 15 goals.

References

Republic of Ireland association footballers
League of Ireland players
Bohemian F.C. players
Year of birth missing
Possibly living people

Association footballers not categorized by position